Ian Peter Middleton (born 1995) is a British cox.

Profile
Whilst in education at Abingdon School he gained colours for the Abingdon School Boat Club. After leaving Abingdon in 2013 he attended Queens' College, Cambridge and joined the Queens' College Boat Club.

Rowing
In 2014 he was selected as the cox for the Cambridge light blue boat at the world renowned Boat Race but finished on the losing side. A second appearance as cox in 2015 ensued but Cambridge once again lost. A third appearance arrived in 2016, which resulted in a win. In addition to representing Cambridge he has coxed Great Britain's under-23 men's eight crew, steering them to sixth place at the 2014 World Rowing U23 Championships in Varese, Italy and a silver medal at the 2016 World Rowing U23 Championships.

See also
 List of Old Abingdonians

References

1995 births
Living people
People educated at Abingdon School
British male rowers
English male rowers
Alumni of Queens' College, Cambridge